Achmed Abdullah (12 May 1881 – 12 May 1945) was the pseudonym of American writer Alexander Nicholayevitch Romanoff (his legal name). He is most noted for his pulp stories of crime, mystery and adventure. He wrote screenplays for some successful films. He was the author of the progressive Siamese drama Chang: A Drama of the Wilderness, an Academy Award-nominated film made in 1927. He earned an Academy Award nomination for collaborating on the screenplay to the 1935 film The Lives of a Bengal Lancer.

Biography

Self-written early biography 
Achmed Abdullah's biography prior to coming to the US is based on his own writings and interviews, and his reminiscences in The Cat had Nine Lives, and is not verified by independent sources.

In 1922, he claimed to a popular writer that his father had been the governor of Kabul. On the 1930 census, he declared that both his parents were born in Afghanistan. In his 1933 autobiography, he claimed that his mother was Princess Nourmahal Durani, a daughter of an Amir, but that his birth father Grand Duke Nicholas Romanoff, a (non-existent) cousin of Czar Nicholas Romanoff, and that he was born Alexander Nicholayevitch Romanoff in Yalta, Russia. In his Social Security application, however, he gave his father's name as "Jor. D. Khan" and his mother's name as "Nurmalal Tarmarlan". Regardless, he consistently gave his birthplace as Yalta.

In various sources including his autobiography, Abdullah claimed that at the age of 12, he was sent to Eton and then to Oxford University to be educated (there are no records about him in either school). He claimed that although he was born Russian Orthodox, he was raised as a Muslim by his uncle who adopted him. Abdullah claimed that he himself was a devout Catholic.

Upon his graduation, he said he joined the British Army and rose to rank of acting colonel during his 17-year military career. He claimed to have served in Afghanistan, Tibet in 1903–04 with the Younghusband Expedition. He was also deployed in Africa, China, and also with the British-Indian army in India. In addition, he was also a colonel in a cavalry regiment for one year in the Turkish army as a British spy. He claimed to have mostly spent the time in the military as a spy because of his wide knowledge of Oriental and Middle Eastern customs and religions. It is said that he traveled widely in Russia, Europe, Africa, the Middle East, and China and spoke many languages and dialects. He claimed he was made a British citizen by an Act of Parliament and convicted by the Germans during the First World War for being a spy.

United States
Sometime before 1912 he emigrated to the United States and eventually became a writer and playwright, and later on, a Hollywood screenwriter. Abdullah's work appeared in several US magazines, including Argosy, All-Story Magazine, Munsey's Magazine and Blue Book. Abdullah's short story collection Wings contains several fantasy stories, which critic Mike Ashley describes as containing "some of his most effective writing". He got a doctorate from the College of El-Azar, Cairo in Koranic Studies.

He translated some Afghan poems, including a poem by the wife of Mohammad Afzal Khan and chaharbeiti lyrics.

Achmed Abdullah married at least three times: to Irene Bainbridge, Jean Wick, and Rosemary A. Dolan. He was the father of two daughters with Irene Bainbridge: Phyllis Abdullah (who died in childhood) and Pamelia Susan Abdullah Brower.

In January 1945, he was admitted to Columbia Presbyterian Medical Center and on May 12, his 64th birthday, he died of a heart attack.

Bibliography 

The Red Stain (New York, Hearst's International Library Co., 1915)
Bucking the Tiger (New York, Robert J. Shores, 1917)
The Blue-Eyed Manchu (New York, Robert J. Shores, 1917)
The Trail of the Beast (New York, James A. McCann, 1919)
The Honourable Gentleman and Others (New York, G. P. Putnam's Sons, 1919)
The Man on Horseback (New York, James A. McCann, 1919)
Wings, Tales of the Psychic (New York, James A. McCann, 1920)
The Ten Foot Chain; or, Can Love Survive the Shackles? (New York, Reynolds, 1920) with Max Brand, E. K. Means, and P. P. Sheehan
The Mating of the Blades (New York, James A. McCann, 1920)
Night Drums (New York, James A. McCann, 1921)
Alien Souls (New York, James A. McCann, 1922)
The Remittance-Woman (Garden City, N.Y., Garden City Pub. Co., 1924)
The Thief of Bagdad (New York, A. L. Burt, 1924)
Shackled (New York, Brentano's, 1924)
The Swinging Caravan (New York, Brentano's, 1925)
The Year of the Wood-Dragon (New York, Brentano's, 1926)
A Wild Goose of Limerick (New York, Brentano's, 1926)
Ruth's Rebellion (New York, George H. Doran, 1927)
Steel and Jade (New York, George H. Doran, 1927)
Lute and Scimitar, Being Poems and Ballads of Central Asia, Translated Out of the Afghan, the Persian, the Turkoman, the Tarantchi, the Bokharan, the Balochi, and the Tartar Tongues, Together with an Introduction and Historical and Philological Annotations (New York, Payson & Clarke, 1928)
They Were So Young (New York, Payson & Clarke, 1929)
Broadway Interlude (New York, Payson & Clarke, 1929) with Faith Baldwin
Dreamers of Empire (New York, Frederick A. Stokes, 1929) with T. Compton Pakenham
Black Tents (New York, Horace Liveright, 1930)
The Veiled Woman, a Novel of West and East (New York, Horace Liveright, 1931)
The Bungalow On the Roof (New York, The Mystery League, 1931)
Girl On the Make (New York, Ray Long & Richard R. Smith, 1932) with Faith Baldwin
A Romantic Young Man (New York, Farrar & Rinehart, 1932)
Love Comes to Sally (New York & Chicago, A. L. Burt, 1933)
The Cat Had Nine Lives; Adventures and Reminiscences (New York, Farrar & Rinehart, 1933) 
Fighting Through (London, Warne, 1933)
Never Without You (New York, Farrar & Rinehart, 1934)
Mysteries of Asia (London, Allen, 1935)
The Flower of the Gods (New York, Green Circle Books, 1936) with Anthony Abbott (pseud. Fulton Oursler)
For Men Only; A Cook Book (New York, G. P. Putnam's Sons, 1937) with John Kenny
Deliver Us from Evil (New York, G. P. Putnam's Sons, 1939)

Filmography

Pagan Love (1920) (screenplay and story - "The Honourable Gentleman")
 Bucking the Tiger (1921) (story)
The Remittance Woman (1923) (novel)
The Thief of Bagdad (1924) (screenplay)
Chang: A Drama of the Wilderness (1927) (titles)
Su última noche (1931) (adaptation)
The Hatchet Man (1932) (play "The Honorable Mr. Wong")
The Lives of a Bengal Lancer (1935) (screenplay)

References 

 Pulp Rack
 Fantastic Fiction Bibliography
Achmed Abdullah at the Supernatural Fiction Database

External links

 
 
 
 
 
 Works at Project Gutenberg Australia (surname 'A')
 

1881 births
1945 deaths
English short story writers
English crime fiction writers
English fantasy writers
20th-century English novelists
English mystery writers
English adventure novelists
Muslim writers
American Muslims
Romanov impostors
20th-century British short story writers
20th-century English screenwriters